Toyah Creek is a stream in western Texas that flows from Balmorhea to the Pecos River.

See also
List of rivers of Texas

References

USGS Geographic Names Information Service
USGS Hydrologic Unit Map - State of Texas (1974)

Rivers of Texas